United Breast Cancer Foundation (UBCF), founded in October 2000, is a national nonprofit headquartered in Huntington Station, New York with a regional office in Annapolis, Maryland

Company overview
Founded in October 2000, the United Breast Cancer Foundation (UBCF) is a national 501(c)(3) nonprofit that began as a small grassroots organization serving low-income, under and uninsured women and men in New York. UBCF has grown to serve women, men and their families across the country as a national philanthropic organization. UBCF has been a Combined Federal Campaign-approved charity since 2013. The organization has been criticized for highly aggressive street marketing tactics under investigation by the NYS Attorney General's Office.

The founder and executive director of UBCF is Stephanie Mastroianni, who was inspired to form the organization after her mother died from breast cancer at the age of 42. Mastroianni is not a volunteer and is one of the highest paid non-profit leaders in the world at $324,500. According to the organization's IRS Form 990, the board is stacked with family members: Mastroianni, her father, Nicholas Mastroianni Sr., and her brother, Nicholas Mastroianni Jr., who comprise the three members of the board of directors.

Charitable works
UBCF's mission is to make a positive difference in the lives of those affected by breast cancer by providing screening, treatment, after-care, educational materials, patient and family assistance and information. UBCF provides grants to hospitals and community health centers to benefit patients and families coping with breast cancer. The Foundation strives to alleviate the stress and strain that cancer can cause to patients and families and to foster health and well-being through both traditional and holistic treatments and never deny anyone service regardless of age, race, gender or income.

UBCF administers seven programs; Breast Screening, Individual Grant, Audrey B. Mastroianni College Scholarship, Holistic Care, Breast Reconstruction, Child Sponsorship, and Community Service.

UBCF's Breast Screening Program provides funds for a variety of breast screening technologies including mammography, ultrasound, breast thermography and MRI to individuals regardless of age, income, gender, race, ethnicity or health insurance coverage. UBCF's Breast Screening Program operates in a unique way. UBCF works with screening facilities across the country to ensure that women and men received the type of screening recommended by their healthcare professional at the location of their choice.

UBCF's Individual Grant Program provides current breast cancer patients or those within three years of remission with customized financial assistance geared towards each individual's personal needs and circumstances. Understanding that breast cancer has a far-reaching impact on every member of the family, UBCF's Individual Grant Program considers not only the breast cancer patient's needs, but the needs of the entire family. The Individual Grant Program provides financial support to those in circumstances where they are unable to pay for critical services and products including, medical procedures, prescription medications, COBRA insurance coverage, housing expenses, utilities, property taxes, prosthetic devices, therapeutic treatments, transportation expenses, vehicle insurance, vehicle payments, and healthy and nutritious foods. Over the years, UBCF has seen that this financial support has reduced patients’ stress, empowering them to be more focused on their healing journey and capable of managing the challenges related to overcoming breast cancer.

The Audrey B. Mastroianni College Scholarship Program is designed to help college bound students who have suffered a loss of a parent or guardian due to breast cancer to make their higher education dreams a reality by providing scholarship funding.

UBCF's Holistic Care Program provides current breast cancer patients or those within 10 years of remission with holistic and complimentary treatments including; yoga, reiki, meditation, diet and nutritional counseling and supplements, counseling, mind-body therapies, energy healing, reflexology, lymphatic massage and acupuncture. 

UBCF's Breast Reconstructive Surgery Program provides women who have had a mastectomy with funding for surgery.

In recognition of breast cancer as a family disease, the Child Sponsorship Program supports children whose parents have breast cancer through funding for emergency housing, back-to-school, healthy food, and special holiday gifts.

UBCF's Community Service Program increases awareness of breast health and wellness through educational campaigns, and further supports the community by distributing gift-in-kind donations and partnering with other charitable organizations to further extend UBCF's mission.

References

External links
 United Breast Cancer Foundation Website

Non-profit organizations based in New York (state)
Medical and health foundations in the United States
Cancer charities in the United States
Breast cancer organizations
Organizations established in 2000
2000 establishments in New York City
Medical and health organizations based in New York (state)